Natural Bridge State Resort Park is a Kentucky state park located in Powell and Wolfe Counties along the Middle Fork of the Red River, adjacent to the Red River Gorge Geologic Area and surrounded by the Daniel Boone National Forest. Its namesake natural bridge is the centerpiece of the park. The natural process of weathering formed the arch over millions of years. In 1981 this land was dedicated into the nature preserves system to protect the ecological communities and rare species habitat. The first federally endangered Virginia big eared bats, Corynorhinus townsendii virginianus, recorded in Kentucky were found at Natural Bridge State Resort Park in the 1950s.

History and trails
The park was founded as a private tourist attraction in 1895 by the Lexington and Eastern Railroad. In 1910, Louisville and Nashville Railroad acquired the land when it purchased the Lexington and Eastern Railroad. In 1926, L&N's President Wible L. Mapother turned over its approximately 137 acres to the Kentucky State Park Commission, making the Park one of Kentucky's original four state parks when that system was established the same year. Some of the most famous sites are the arch itself, "Lovers Leap", and "Fat Man's Squeeze". The park's  "Original Trail" to the natural bridge dates from the 1890s. Other trails include the  Sand Gap Trail and the  Balanced Rock Trail. Five miles (8 km) of the  Sheltowee Trace National Recreation Trail run through the park, including the Whittleton Trail which connects the park to the Red River Gorge Geologic Area. Activities such as hiking off-trails, disturbing wildlife, or collecting plants are not legal in any Kentucky State Park, and pets are not allowed on most trails at Natural Bridge State Park. "Fat Man's Squeeze", a narrow passage in the rock formation, leads to the bottom of the arch.

Natural Bridge has several unique sandstone rock formations, including the Balanced Rock. This is a huge block of sandstone balanced on the edge of a cliff near the Natural Bridge. The "Balanced Rock", is located on Trail #2, not far above Hemlock Lodge.  In the early days of the Park, it was called the Sphinx because, when viewed from the correct angle, it crudely resembles the Sphinx in Egypt.  Although it is now called the Balanced Rock, it is in fact a pedestal rock - a single piece of stone that has weathered in such a fashion that its midsection is narrower than its cap or its base.  This formation is one of the biggest and most perfectly formed examples of a pedestal rock east of the Rocky Mountains.

Annual events

Natural Bridge State Park is a member of the Leave No Trace Center for Outdoor Ethics, and offers guided backpacking trips and natural history educational programs.  Annual events open to the public include Herpetology Weekend each May, Natural Arches Weekend each February, and the Kentucky Native Plant Society's Wildflower Weekend each April.

The Kentucky Natives Society's Wildflower Weekend in April consists of Kentucky plants and how they are essential to the well-being of our natural ecosystems commonwealth. " We incorporate research and support efforts to identify and protect endangered, threatened, and rare native plant species," says KNPS.ORG.

The State Park is also famous for hosting traditional Appalachian square dances. The traditional Appalachian style dances are held on Friday and Saturday evenings throughout the warm starlit Ky summers on the open-air dance floor.  The dance draws hundreds of participants and spectators, showcasing dance groups and singer/performer talents from all over.

Gallery

See also

 Slade, Kentucky—unincorporated community within the boundaries of the park

References

External links
Office of Kentucky Nature Preserves
Natural Bridge State Resort Park at Kentucky State Parks
Natural Bridge State Resort Park at American Byways
Leave No Trace

State parks of Kentucky
Natural arches of Kentucky
Protected areas of Powell County, Kentucky
Protected areas established in 1926
Protected areas of Wolfe County, Kentucky
Daniel Boone National Forest
Nature centers in Kentucky
Landforms of Wolfe County, Kentucky
Landforms of Powell County, Kentucky
1926 establishments in Kentucky